José Fernando Bello Amigo Serans (born 5 November 1978) is a Spanish-born Australian retired footballer who played as a goalkeeper.

Football career
Born in Santa Uxía de Ribeira, Galicia, Bello Amigo began his career in Australia at St. George Saints Football Club, and was transferred in 1998 to the APIA Leichhardt Tigers FC. Two years later, he moved to Canterbury-Marrickville.

From 2001 to 2008, Bello Amigo played in Spain, mainly in its second division, with Racing de Ferrol (four seasons, promoting in 2004 from the third level) and Polideportivo Ejido (three). After the Andalusians dropped down a tier at the end of the 2007–08 campaign, he joined neighbours Jerez Industrial CF and competed in division four.

After contributing to Jerez's promotion, Bello Amigo was released. A few months after he returned to his country of adoption, signing with the Marconi Stallions FC.

Bello Amigo returned to the Leichhardt Tigers, for the 2011 NSW Premier League season.

Personal life
Bello Amigo's father is a former professional footballer. He too played for Racing Ferrol, before emigrating to Australia.

References

External links

OzFootball profile

1978 births
Living people
Spanish emigrants to Australia
Spanish footballers
People from O Barbanza
Sportspeople from the Province of A Coruña
Australian soccer players
Association football goalkeepers
Segunda División players
Segunda División B players
Tercera División players
Racing de Ferrol footballers
Polideportivo Ejido footballers
Jerez Industrial CF players
APIA Leichhardt FC players
Marconi Stallions FC players
Expatriate soccer players in Australia
Expatriate soccer managers in Australia
Australian soccer coaches